Italy competed at the FIS Alpine World Ski Championships 1982 in Schladming, Austria, from 28 January to 7 February 1982.

Medalists

Results

Men

Women

See also
 Italy at the FIS Alpine World Ski Championships
 Italy national alpine ski team

References

External links
 Italian Winter Sports Federation 

Nations at the FIS Alpine World Ski Championships 1982
Alpine World Ski Championships
Italy at the FIS Alpine World Ski Championships